Movies That Shook the World was a television documentary series in 13 episodes, first broadcast between September and December 2005 on the American AMC channel. Each episode dealt with a classic American film.

Episodes

External links

AMC (TV channel) original programming
2000s American documentary television series
2005 American television series debuts
2005 American television series endings